Christchurch Town Centre is the town centre of Christchurch, a town in Dorset (historically in Hampshire). The town centre is a major shopping district in East Dorset.

History 
In 2014, Christchurch Borough Council planned for a piazza and traffic restrictions.

In 2020, plans for a revamp of the town centre were announced.

Buildings 

 The Town Hall
 Saxon Square

Politics 
Christchurch Town Centre is part of the Christchurch parliamentary constituency for elections to the House of Commons. It is currently represented by Conservative MP Christopher Chope.

The Town Centre was part of the Town Centre ward which elected two councillors to Christchurch Borough Council.

The town centre is currently part of the Christchurch Town ward and elects two Councillors to Bournemouth, Christchurch and Poole Council.

References 

Areas of Christchurch, Dorset
Central business districts in the United Kingdom
Conservation areas in Dorset